École Vétérinaire de Maisons-Alfort is a station on line 8 of the Paris Métro in the commune of Maisons-Alfort, named after the nearby École nationale vétérinaire d'Alfort, the national veterinary school founded in 1765.

The station opened on 19 September 1970 with the extension of the line from Porte de Charenton - Écoles to Maisons-Alfort - Stade.

Also nearby is the Musée Fragonard d'Alfort, a museum of anatomical oddities.

Station layout

References
Roland, Gérard (2003). Stations de métro. D’Abbesses à Wagram. Éditions Bonneton.

Paris Métro stations in Maisons-Alfort
Railway stations in France opened in 1970